Shigeyoshi (written: 重喜, 重好, 重能, 重良, 重義, 重吉, 成美, 成栄, 茂義 or 臣善) is a masculine Japanese given name. Notable people with the name include:

 (1738–1801), Japanese daimyō
 (born 1953), Japanese sumo wrestler
 (1889–1975), Imperial Japanese Navy admiral
 (1493–1580), Japanese samurai
 (1901–1991), Japanese engineer, politician and educator
 (1843–1916), Japanese businessman and banker
 (1892–1959), Imperial Japanese Navy admiral
 (born 1973), Japanese footballer
 (1527–1583), Japanese samurai
 (1902–1971), Japanese footballer
 (1900–1976), Japanese film director
 (1745–1795), Japanese samurai

Japanese masculine given names